Pumilus is a monotypic genus of brachiopods belonging to the family Kraussinidae. The only species is Pumilus antiquatus.

The species is found in New Zealand.

References

Terebratulida